The Hillandale estate comprises a pair of historic structures located in the Burleith neighborhood in Washington, D.C. They have been listed on the National Register of Historic Places since 1995.

History 
The estate was originally the home of heiress Anne Archbold, a daughter of Standard Oil executive John D. Archbold, who was a prominent Washington socialite. She donated much of the land that became Glover-Archbold Park. The buildings are the only known Washington works of Boston architect Josephine Wright Chapman. They were built from 1922 to 1925 in the Italian Villa style. The  site included the gatehouse and wall that was along Reservoir Road, NW with the main residence near the top of a hill. The building exteriors feature stucco facades, terra cotta tile roofs, balconies and loggias. The interior of the main residence includes a frescoed vestibule and music room with a vaulted ceiling. In the late 1970s and the early 1980s the estate was subdivided and 28 single family residences and 238 townhouses were built in a gated community. The main residence was converted into two single-family dwellings

References

Houses completed in 1925
Italianate architecture in Washington, D.C.
Houses on the National Register of Historic Places in Washington, D.C.
1925 establishments in Washington, D.C.